A list of notable lesbian feminist organizations.

Asia and the Middle East

Israel
 Kehila Lesbit Feministit/Community of Lesbian Feminists (KLaF/CLAF) – a lesbian feminist organization that published the quarterly periodical Klaf Hazak.

Thailand
 Anjaree – a lesbian feminist and later LGBT organization formed in 1986, defunct by 2011.

Europe

Denmark
Lesbian Movement - a lesbian feminist organization founded in Copenhagen and active between 1974 and 1985.

France
Gouines rouges (Red Dykes) - a radical lesbian feminist movement active in the 1970s.

The Netherlands 
Lesbian Nation (organisation), lesbian feminist activist group, 1976 until the mid-1980s

United Kingdom
Leeds Revolutionary Feminist Group - a radical lesbian feminist organization active in Leeds, England in the 1970s and 1980s that promoted political lesbianism.
Lesbians Against Pit Closures - a working-class socialist lesbian-feminist alliance that worked to support striking miners during the UK miners' strike (1984–85), formed by lesbian feminists originally affiliated with Lesbians and Gays Support the Miners.

Oceania

New Zealand
Sisters for Homophile Equality - a lesbian feminist organization active in Christchurch and Wellington in the 1970s and 1980s that published the journal Lesbian Feminist Circle.

South America

Bolivia
Mujeres Creando, a Bolivian anarcha-feminist lesbian collective.

North America

Canada
Lesbian Organization of Toronto - the first lesbian feminist organization in Canada.

Mexico
Lesbos - a lesbian feminist organization founded in 1977.
Oikabeth (Mujeres guerreras que abren caminos y esparcen flores) - a lesbian separatist organization founded in 1977.
Van Dykes, an itinerant band of lesbian separatists who lived and traveled in vans throughout the United States and Mexico.

United States
AMASONG - a lesbian feminist amateur choir based in Champaign–Urbana, Illinois.
Amazon Bookstore Cooperative - the first lesbian/feminist bookstore in the United States, located in Minneapolis, Minnesota,  from 1970 to 2012.
Artemis Singers - a lesbian feminist chorus based in Chicago, Illinois.
Atlanta Lesbian Feminist Alliance - a lesbian feminist organization in Atlanta, Georgia.
Combahee River Collective - a black lesbian feminist socialist organization in Boston, Massachusetts from 1974 to 1980 that coined the term identity politics.
Daughters of Bilitis - first lesbian civil and political rights organization in the United States.
The Feminists - a radical feminist group active in New York City from 1968 to 1973 that promoted political lesbianism and later matriarchy.
The Furies Collective - a lesbian separatist commune active in Washington, D.C. from 1971 to 1972.
Lavender Menace - an informal group of lesbian radical feminists formed to protest the exclusion of lesbians and lesbian issues from the feminist movement.
Lesbian Art Project - a participatory lesbian-feminist art movement at the Woman's Building in Los Angeles.
Lesbian Avengers - a lesbian feminist organization founded in New York City in 1992, most notable for creating the Dyke March.
Lesbian Feminist Liberation - a feminist lesbian rights advocacy organization in New York City formed in 1972.
Lincoln Legion of Lesbians - a lesbian feminist collective in Lincoln, Nebraska, that supported lesbian rights, separatism, and women-only spaces.
Oregon Women's Land Trust - a 501(c)(3) membership organization that holds land for conservation and educational purposes in the state of Oregon as part of the womyn's land movement.
Salsa Soul Sisters - a lesbian feminist and lesbian womanist collective of Black lesbians and other lesbians of color that is the oldest Black lesbian organization in the United States.
Van Dykes, an itinerant band of lesbian separatists who lived and traveled in vans throughout the United States and Mexico.

See also
 Lesbian feminism
 Lesbian organizations
 Lesbian separatism
List of feminist organizations
 List of LGBT-related organizations

References

Feminist organizations
 
Feminism-related lists